Virgins of the Seven Seas (original title: Yang Chi, also known as Enter The 7 Virgins and The Bod Squad) is a 1974 Hong Kong-West German martial arts-comedy film directed by Kuei Chih-Hung and Ernst Hofbauer and starring Elliot Ngok and Sonja Jeannine. The German version titled Karate, Küsse, blonde Katzen saw theatrical release on 15 August 1974 and was released on DVD in August 2010.

Theme
Virgins of the Seven Seas features a great amount of gratuitous nudity and its title cast is composed of sexploitation film actresses of the period, two of them, Sonja Jeannine and Deborah Ralls, from sex report films of Hofbauer. The German film encyclopaedia Lexikon des internationalen Films describes the film as "Schoolgirls goes Hong Kong: Wild mix of cheap Asian pirate-kung fu films and the German sex posse."

Plot
A ship sailing in the pre-First Opium War South China Sea is attacked by pirates and five British maidens on board are kidnapped. They are sold to a brothel run by Chao (Hsieh Wang), starting to get trained in sexual techniques for the day when they shall be auctioned. However, one of the attendants, Ko Mei-mei (Lau Wai-Ling) takes pity at the girls' fate and, with her brother Ko Pao (Elliot Ngok credited as Yueh Hua), begins to secretly instruct the girls in kung fu. Meanwhile, a romantic liaison between Pao and one of the girls, Dawn (Sonja Jeannine) emerges.

Cast
Elliot Ngok: Ko Pao
Lau Wai-Ling (Liu Hui-ling): Ko Mei-mei
Hsieh Wang: Chao
Sonja Jeannine: Dawn
Gillian Bray: Brenda
Diane Drube: Anna
Tamara Elliot: Karen
Deborah Ralls: Celia

Home Video
The German version titled Karate, Küsse, blonde Katzen was released on DVD by the label Camera Obscura in August 2010 and on limited edition Blu-ray by the label FilmArt on May 6, 2022.

References

External links

Virgins of the Seven Seas at the Hong Kong Movie Database
Virgins of the Seven Seas at Hong Kong Cinemagic

1974 films
Hong Kong martial arts comedy films
1970s Mandarin-language films
1970s English-language films
1970s sex comedy films
1970s action comedy films
1974 martial arts films
Hong Kong multilingual films
German multilingual films
Films set in the Qing dynasty
Pirate films
Shaw Brothers Studio films
West German films
Hong Kong action comedy films
Hong Kong sex comedy films
German action comedy films
German sex comedy films
1974 multilingual films
Films directed by Ernst Hofbauer
1974 comedy films
1970s German films
1970s Hong Kong films